Weghat Nazar (Arabic: وجهات نظر) is an Arabic monthly magazine that features essays and book reviews on politics, culture, literature, and current affairs. The publication, whose name in Arabic means ‘points of views,’ was inspired by its editors’ vision that the only answer to difference in opinions is dialogue, and that dialogue is an exchange of ‘points of views.’

History

The periodical
Weghat Nazar was founded in 1999 by leading Egyptian journalist Mohamed Hassanein Heikal, and published by Ibrahim El Moallem  Chairman of Dar El Shorouk publishing house, with journalist and writer Salama Ahmed Salama as its first editor-in-chief, later succeeded by Ayman Al-Sayyad. The idea was inspired by what the editors felt is a lack of intellectual space for deep, thoughtful and meaningful dialogue in the Arab region, in a media environment filled with noise, and ideological warfare. As part of its mission to be a window for Arabic readers to global thought, in addition to original contributions, the periodical routinely published translations for a selection of articles from fellow literary journals including The New York Review of Books, The New Yorker, London Review of Books, The Atlantic Monthly and Harper's Magazine

Since its first edition, Weghat Nazar received wide popularity amongst thought leaders, academics and policy makers in the Arab region, as well as those with interest in the region. The periodical quickly became known as the leading literary-intellectual magazine in the Arabic language, and for its layout and covers illustrated by renowned Egyptian artist Helmi El Touni.Since the first edition, Heikal remained closely involved with the editorial process, in addition to writing the periodical’s main feature, until his retirement in 2003. Later, the periodical became associated with the name of its editor Ayman Al-Sayyad, also independently known for his efforts in reconciliation and transitional justice initiatives in the region.

Weghat Nazar Dialogues
In 2009, Ayman Al-Sayyad, editor of Weghat Nazar started Weghat Nazar Dialogues a culture initiative that which conducts seminars, consultations and public dialogues on  key political and development issues in the region. The Dialogues began with a partnership with the UNDP, and its events’ co-hosts/ participants have so far included Bibliotheca Alexandria, National Aeronautics and Space Administration (NASA), Al-Jazeera Center for Studies, and the Georgetown University Center for International and Regional Studies.

Notable contributors
Notable contributors to Weghat Nazar have included Arabic and non-Arabic authors alike, including but not limited to:

 Alain Gresh
 Ahmed Zewail
 Alistair Horne
 Ayman Al-Sayyad
 Ismail Serageldin
 Bahaa Taher
 Tharwat Okasha
 Gaber Asfour
 Galal Amin
 Gamal El-Ghitani
 Joseph Massad

 John Esposito
 John Waterbury
 Joel Beinin
 Hazem Al Beblawi
 Hassan Hanafi
 Khairy Shalaby
 Denys Johnson-Davies
 Raouf Abbas
 Ratiba El-Hefny

 Rushdi Said
 Rashid Khalidi
 Radwa Ashour
 Stephen Walt
 Sahar Khalifeh
 Salama Ahmed Salama
 Salman Abu Sitta
 Samha El-Kholy
 Shawqi Daif
 Sadiq Jalal al-Azm

 Sonallah Ibrahim
 Tarek El-Bishry
 Tariq Ramadan

See also
 List of magazines in Egypt

References

External links

1999 establishments in Egypt
Arabic-language magazines
Book review magazines
Cultural magazines
Literary magazines published in Egypt
Magazines established in 1999
Magazines published in Cairo
Monthly magazines published in Egypt